The canton of Saint-Renan is an administrative division of the Finistère department, northwestern France. Its borders were modified at the French canton reorganisation which came into effect in March 2015. Its seat is in Saint-Renan.

It consists of the following communes:
 
Brélès
Le Conquet
Île-Molène
Lampaul-Plouarzel
Lanildut
Lanrivoaré
Locmaria-Plouzané
Milizac-Guipronvel
Ouessant
Plouarzel
Plougonvelin
Ploumoguer
Plourin
Porspoder
Saint-Renan
Trébabu
Tréouergat

References

Cantons of Finistère